Tomáš Chovanec (born 21 November 1987) is a Slovak football striker.

References

External links
MFK Ružomberok profile 

1987 births
Living people
Slovak footballers
Association football forwards
MFK Ružomberok players
MFK Karviná players
Expatriate footballers in the Czech Republic
Expatriate footballers in Malaysia
Slovak expatriate sportspeople in Malaysia
MFK Dolný Kubín players
MŠK Rimavská Sobota players
MFK Zemplín Michalovce players
Slovak Super Liga players
Slovak expatriate sportspeople in the Czech Republic